Miss Teen USA 1989, the 7th Miss Teen USA pageant, was televised live from Orange Pavilion, San Bernardino, California on July 25, 1989. At the conclusion of the final competition, Brandi Sherwood of Idaho was crowned by outgoing titleholder Mindy Duncan of Oregon.

This was the second and final year the pageant was held in San Bernardino. It was hosted by Wil Shriner, with color commentary from Marcia Strassman and Angela Visser, Miss Universe 1989.

Results

Placements

Special awards

Final competition scores

 Winner 
 First runner-up
 Second runner-up 
 Third runner-up
 Fourth runner-up

Historical significance 
 Idaho wins competition for the first time. Also becoming in the 7th state who wins Miss Teen USA.
 Kentucky earns the 1st runner-up position for the first time. 
 Vermont earns the 2nd runner-up position for the first time.
 Texas earns the 3rd runner-up position for the second time. The last time it placed this was in 1985.
 North Dakota earns the 4th runner-up position for the second time. The last time it placed this was in 1987.
 States that placed in semifinals the previous year were Alabama, New York and Texas. 
 New York placed for the fourth consecutive year.
 Alabama and Texas made their second consecutive placement.
 North Dakota and Oklahoma last placed in 1987.
 South Dakota last placed in 1986.
 Washington last placed in 1985.
 Kentucky last placed in 1983.
 Idaho placed for the first time.
 Vermont placed for the first time.
 Mississippi breaks an ongoing streak of placements since 1987.
 Louisiana breaks an ongoing streak of placements since 1986.

Judges
Dale Harimoto
Miguel Nunez
Steve Guback
Jill Whelan
Jane Pratt
Richard Lawrence
Patrick St. Clair
Frank Dicopoulos
Dr. Joy Brown
Erin Gray

Delegates 
The Miss Teen USA 1989 delegates were:

 Alabama - Jeannie Plott - Age: 17
 Alaska - Amy Allen
 Arizona - Leann Elston
 Arkansas - Susan Marshall
 California - Michealean Bonilla
 Colorado - Janna Durbin
 Connecticut - Suzanne Ianucci
 Delaware - Alison Wilson
 District of Columbia - Christina Patino
 Florida - Debbie Knox
 Georgia - Kim Malloy
 Hawaii - Paulette Dean
 Idaho - Brandi Sherwood - Age: 17
 Illinois - Kimberly Hannell
 Indiana - Jackie Hartt
 Iowa - Stacie Beckwith
 Kansas - Tracey Knopp      
 Kentucky - Kristie Dawn Hicks - Age: 17
 Louisiana - Kim Clower
 Maine - Lisa Bailey
 Maryland - Stacey Harris
 Massachusetts - Molly Rihm
 Michigan - Betsy Cox
 Minnesota - Darcy Inglested
 Mississippi - Valarie Penn
 Missouri - April Smith
 Montana - Jennifer Cook
 Nebraska - Melissa Giddings
 Nevada - Stacey Bentley
 New Hampshire - Kerri Sossei
 New Jersey - Yvonne Christiano
 New Mexico - Shana Wilmont
 New York -  Beth Savage - Age: 16
 North Carolina - Kelly Sheppard
 North Dakota - Heidi Jo Langseth - Age: 17
 Ohio - Missy Craw
 Oklahoma - Staci Fulsom
 Oregon - Catherine Dunnam
 Pennsylvania - Jennifer Gary
 Rhode Island - Deb Hodges 
 South Carolina - Michelle Warner
 South Dakota - Lisa Williamson - Age: 17
 Tennessee - Amy Sims
 Texas - Kristi Wright - Age: 16
 Utah - Tracy Kennick
 Vermont - Kara Quinn - Age: 15
 Virginia - Stephanie Satterfield
 Washington - Amy Travis
 West Virginia - Jennifer Jo Dunn
 Wisconsin - Shannon Redman
 Wyoming - Gretchen Wathen

Historical significance 
 This was Idaho's first placement at Miss Teen USA and she went on to win the title.
 Kentucky recorded their highest placement in the pageant's history; this has yet to be equalled or surpassed.
 Vermont also placed for the first time, and only placed one more time in 1993, when Vermont won the title. Vermont later placed 3 more times in 2015, 2016 and 2017.
 This equalled North Dakota's highest placement since 1987, a record surpassed in 2006 when they placed second runner-up. Audra Mari surpassed the record at Miss Teen USA 2011 placing First Runner Up. Later equalling her placement at Miss USA 2014
 Washington placed for the first time since 1985.
 New York placed for the fourth consecutive year; South Dakota placed only for the second until 2017.

Contestant notes 
 Brandi Sherwood won the 1997 Miss Idaho USA title and competed in the 1997 Miss USA pageant, where she placed first runner-up to the eventual winner, Hawaii's Brook Mahealani Lee.  Lee became Miss Universe 1997 a couple of months later, so Brandi assumed the Miss USA title.  She is the only Miss Teen USA winner to hold the Miss USA title. She later became a  Barker's Beauty model on the daytime game show The Price Is Right.
 Kristie Dawn Hicks (Kentucky) later won the 1995 Miss Kentucky title and competed at Miss America 1996.
 Miss Nevada Teen USA 1989 was initially Heather McLeod, who was disqualified because she had competed at Miss California Teen USA the same year.  McLeod was replaced by Stacey Bentley only days before the national pageant was held.
Three other contestants later competed at Miss USA:
Tracy Kennick (Utah) - Miss Utah USA 1996 (Top 10 semifinalist at Miss USA 1996)
Jana Durban (Colorado) - Miss Colorado USA 1993
Stephanie Satterfield (Virginia) - Miss Virginia USA 1993

References 

1989
1989 beauty pageants
1989 in California